Palak Pe Jhalak is an Indian supernatural teen sitcom television series which premiered on Disney Channel India. It is adaptation of American series That's So Raven. The series produced by Rose Audio Visuals  premiered on 27 September 2015 and ended on 9 December 2015.

Plot
The show is set in Delhi and revolves around teenager Nysha Kapoor (Ayesha Kaduskar), her friends, and her family members; mother (Khyati Keswani), father (Nitesh Pandey), brother (Arush Rana), and her best friends Ishaan (Vaibhav Thakkar) and Tara
(Anam Anuji).

Nysha Kapoor, a teenage girl, receives psychic visions of future events (which she calls 'Palak Pe Jhalak')
when in deep situations. Attempting to make or prevent these visions coming true frequently results in trouble and hilarious situations for herself, her family and her friends.

Episodes

The Season 1 of Palak Pe Jhalak started airing on Disney channel India on with the episode "Mother Dearest" and ended in March, 2016 with the episode, "Crazy Sister".

References

External links 
 
Palak Pe Jhalak at TV Guide

That's So Raven
Indian television series based on American television series
Disney Channel (Indian TV channel) original programming
2015 Indian television series debuts
2015 Indian television series endings
Rose Audio Visuals
Television shows set in Delhi
Television shows about psychic powers
Indian teen sitcoms
Hindi language television sitcoms
Television series about teenagers